The 2nd constituency of the Vosges is a French legislative constituency in the Vosges département.

Description

Vosges' 2nd Constituency consists of the north-eastern corner of Vosges and includes the town of Saint-Dié-des-Vosges as well the surrounding countryside and small villages.

The constituency has historically been a marginal one with the Socialist Party winning in 1978, 1981 and 1997. The constituency, has however, now been represented by the conservative UMP party since 2002.

Notably the defeated PS candidate at the 2012 election was the former Education and Culture minister Jack Lang.

Historic Representation

Election results

2022

 
 
|-
| colspan="8" bgcolor="#E9E9E9"|
|-

2017

 
 
 
 
 
 
|-
| colspan="8" bgcolor="#E9E9E9"|
|-

2012

 
 
 
 
|-
| colspan="8" bgcolor="#E9E9E9"|
|-

2007

 
 
 
 
 
 
 
|-
| colspan="8" bgcolor="#E9E9E9"|
|-

2002

 
 
 
 
 
|-
| colspan="8" bgcolor="#E9E9E9"|
|-

1997

 
 
 
 
 
|-
| colspan="8" bgcolor="#E9E9E9"|
|-

Sources
Official results of French elections from 2002: "Résultats électoraux officiels en France" (in French).

2